G. Marq Roswell is an American tech entrepreneur, music supervisor, and film producer based in Los Angeles, California.

Early years
Roswell was raised in Los Angeles, California. A sixth-generation Californian. He is a descendant of the del Valle Family of Rancho Camulos in Ventura County.

Roswell's interest and taste in music was shaped by attending the 1967 Monterey Pop Festival and witnessing seminal performances by The Who, Otis Redding and the Jimi Hendrix Experience, who famously set his guitar aflame in the finale of his performance.  In 1968-69, Roswell worked as a stage manager at the Shrine Exhibition Hall in downtown Los Angeles. It was there that he saw many of the major acts of that era, including the Buffalo Springfield, Albert King, The Grateful Dead, Traffic, Quicksilver Messenger Service, Buffalo Springfield, Mothers of Invention (Frank Zappa's backing band), Jimi Hendrix, The Electric Flag, Cream, Buddy Guy, Canned Heat, The Chambers Brothers, Jeff Beck, Iron Butterfly, and Big Brother and the Holding Company, best known as the band which featured Janis Joplin.

Roswell attended UCLA Film School, graduating in 1971. 

In 1976, he helped form and manage the band Player, which was signed to Robert Stigwood's RSO Records. The band's platinum single "Baby Come Back" eventually hit number one on the Billboard Hot 100 Chart, producing a gold album, and tours with Boz Scaggs, Kenny Loggins, Heart, and Eric Clapton. After attending an early screening at Paramount Studios of the Stigwood-produced Saturday Night Fever,  with its massive breakout soundtrack by the Bee Gees, Roswell sold his management and publishing interest to partner Paul Palmer and pursued a career as a music supervisor for films.

Music supervision
Roswell found a mentor in top music supervisor Becky Shargo Winding (Footloose, Urban Cowboy).

He began his career in music supervision by bringing the Fine Young Cannibals to director Barry Levinson to score and write songs for Tin Men, which became the catalyst for their follow up triple-platinum album The Raw and the Cooked, including the number one hits "She Drives Me Crazy" and "Good Thing," which was written for the film.

While overseeing music supervision on The Commitments, Roswell formed and managed a joint venture between Beacon Films and Polygram Publishing (now Universal Music) to develop Irish musical artists and film scores. In that capacity, he was able to sign The Corrs and secure them a deal with Atlantic Records. The band went on to sell 40 million records worldwide. 

Roswell produced many score and soundtrack LPs for Beacon; Air Force One, Family Man, Spy Game, Sugar Hill, Bring It On, The Hurricane, Playing God, End of Days, Midnight Clear, Love of The Game, and The Commitments, among others. The Commitments was nominated for a Grammy and sold five million albums worldwide.

After music supervising the Chris Farley vehicle Tommy Boy for Paramount Pictures, Roswell became a consultant for Lorne Michaels' Broadway Video. It was there that he orchestrated a joint venture between Broadway Video and Mercury Records to develop comedy albums and DVDs featuring the live musical guests on Saturday Night Live.

Roswell contributed to the musical landscape of more than 60 feature films, numerous documentaries, television series, and produced many successful score and soundtrack albums. His impressive list of credits includes The Great Debaters, The Hurricane, Man with the Iron Fists, Tommy Boy, Dawn of the Dead, and Wild at Heart.

Roswell also produced many "on-camera" songs for actors in feature films, including Nicolas Cage in Wild at Heart, Kevin Costner in Love of the Game and Keanu Reeves in Sweet November. These production efforts went on to also include many on camera artists appearing on film soundtracks, including Koko Taylor for Wild at Heart and Sharon Jones, the Carolina Chocolate Drops and Alvin Youngblood Heart for The Great Debaters. On The Thing Called Love, set in Nashville song-mills, Roswell hired T Bone Burnett and Steven Soles to produce songs for actors River Phoenix, Sandra Bullock, Samantha Mathis, and Dermot Mulroney. Roswell and T Bone Burnett came together again to produce the end title song for A Midnight Clear, featuring singer Sam Phillips.

In his capacity as a music supervisor, Roswell has worked with many top screen composers, including Tommy Newman, Alexander Desplat, Danny Elfman, Chris Young, Tyler Bates, Harry Gregson-Williams, Mark Isham, James Newton Howard, Angelo Badalamenti, Jerry Goldsmith, Marvin Hamlisch, John Debney, Christophe Beck, Terrance Blanchard, Aaron Zigman, John Frizzell and Graeme Revell. 

Roswell has worked with many musical artists including RZA, the Black Keys, Kanye West, Guns N' Roses, Bob Dylan, The Roots, Mos Def, Eminem, Corinne Bailey Rae, Jewel, Rodney Crowell, Steve Earle, Garth Brooks, Limp Bizkit, Korn, and many others in a variety of capacities.

Roswell paid it forward by mentoring and working with some of the top music supervisors in the TV and Film industry today; Randall Poster, Pilar McCurry, Gary Calamar, Thomas Golubic, Robin Urdang, Jennifer Pyken, Karen Rachtman, Carter Little, Dondi Bastone, Helle Huxley, Garth Trinidad, and Adam Swart.

Roswell has also provided his expertise on award winning documentaries; Wal-Mart: The High Cost of Low Price, Iraq for Sale, and PBS' Circus & Half the Sky. He is the co-executive music producer with Carter Little on Grammy nominated Soundbreaking, the 8-hour documentary series, conceived with and inspired by Sir George Martin. He is currently co-music supervisor with Dondi Baste in the upcoming Apollo Theater documentary, directed by Academy Award winner Roger Ross Williams and produced by Nigel Sinclair of White Horse Pictures.

Film producer
Roswell co-produced I Saw the Light, directed and written by Marc Abraham, starring Tom Hiddleston, who portrays the legendary singer-songwriter Hank Williams. The soundtrack album was produced by Rodney Crowell, Roswell, Carter Little, and Ray Kennedy.

Technology
Roswell is currently the Founder and CEO of TunesMap, makers of a mobile and TV app that contextually organizes and presents high quality content from preferred partners and artists.

Personal life
Roswell lives in the Pacific Palisades with his wife Karen, and his son, Cal del Valle.

Filmography
 Soundbreaking (2016)
 I Saw the Light (2015)
 The Man with the Iron Fists (2012)
 Half the Sky (2012)
 Marina Abramovic: The Artist is Present (2012)
 Birth Story (2012)
 Amnesty International 50th Anniversary (2011)
 Chevy 100: An American Story (2011)
 Circus (2010)
 Flash of Genius (2008)
 Garden Party (2008)
 The Great Debaters (2007)
 The Brothers Solomon (2007)
 The Bronx Is Burning (2007)
 The Last Day of Summer (2007)
 The Grand (2007)
 Let's Go to Prison (2006)
 Hard Luck (2006)
 Iraq for Sale (2006)
 Walmart: The High Cost of Low Price (2005)
 Casanova (2005)
 An Unfinished Life (2005)
 The Big White (2005)
 Man of the House (2005)
 Dawn of the Dead (2004)
 Redemption (2004)
 Killer Diller (2004)
 Walking Tall (2004)
 Baadasssss! (2003)
 Auto Focus (2002)
 Collateral Damage (2002)
 Rock Star (2001)
 Spy Game (2001)
 Sweet November (2001)
 Pay It Forward (2000)
 Bring It On (2000)
 The Family Man (2000)
 The Replacements (2000)
 It Had to Be You (2000)
 End of Days (1999)
 The Hurricane (1999)
 For the Love of the Game (1999)
 Simpatico (1999)
 Varsity Blues (1999)
 Slums of Beverly Hills (1998)
 Playing God (1997)
 'Til There Was You (1997)
 Kids in the Hall: Brain Candy (1996)
 The Baby-Sitters Club (1995)
 Tommy Boy (1995)
 Princess Caraboo (1994)
 The Road to Wellville (1994)
 Sugar Hill (1993)
 The Thing Called Love (1993)
 Three of Hearts (1993)
 The Gun in Betty Lou's Handbag (1992)
 A Midnight Clear (1992)
 Ladybugs (1992)
 Frankie and Johnny (1991)
 The Commitments (1991)
 Career Opportunities (1991)
 Sleeping with the Enemy (1991)
 A Gnome Named Gnorm (1990)
 Wild at Heart (1990)
 Madhouse (1990)
 Love or Money (1990)
 Big Man on Campus (1989)
 The Blue Iguana (1988)
 Cross My Heart (1987)
 Tin Men (1987)

See also
 Gary Calamar

References
Ferguson, Jason (February 6, 2008). "Various Artists: The Great Debaters: Music From & Recorded for the Motion Picture." Houston Press.
Flattum, Jerry (January 17, 2003). "The Story Leads the Dance: An Interview with Music Supervisor G. Marq Roswell." The Muse's Muse. 
Saidman, Sorelle (September 9, 1999). "Good God, Guns!: Guns n' Roses cut new track "Oh My God" with Dave Navarro." Rolling Stone.

Specific

External links
 "Good God, Guns" , Rolling Stone, September 9, 1999
 
 TunesMap

Living people
American producers
American technology chief executives
Record producers from Los Angeles
Year of birth missing (living people)